Playa Mayabeque (Mayabeque Beach) is a location in the southern part of Mayabeque Province, within 15 kilometers of Melena del Sur on the southern shore of Cuba.  The waters are muddy, to which local people attribute therapeutic properties. In the beach it is located the old outlet of the Mayabeque River ("Antiguo Mayabeque"), the most important river in the former Havana province, which gave its name to the new province of Mayabeque established in 2011.

History

Overview
On the shores of the Mayabeque river close to Playa Mayabeque the original Havana village (San Cristobal de La Habana) was founded by Diego Velázquez de Cuéllar in 1514 or 1515, before it was moved to the north coast in 1519. Because of this possibility, in the coat of arms of Melena del Sur appears a Latin phrase that say "HIC EST CONDIT HAVANA PRIMO", that is: Here was founded Havana the first time.

Mayabeque National Camp School
In 1956, under the leadership of Serafín García Menocal, President of the Consejo Nacional Scouts de Cuba (National Council), the Scouts of Cuba bought the national training grounds Campo Escuela Nacional Mayabeque at Mayabeque, in the margins of the river of the same name, near Catalina de Güines in Havana Province within 50 km of the capital. The National Camp School was dedicated to the training of Scouters and for Scout camping. The Field School was abandoned in 1961, and at the moment is under the water of Pedroso reservoir.

Geography
The village is located by the Caribbean Sea, 5 km south of Melena del Sur and 7 from the southern end of the A3 motorway to Havana (50 km far). It is 25 km from Güines, 37 from San José de las Lajas, 27 from Batabanó and 30 from Surgidero.

Gallery

See also

Melena del Sur
List of cities in Cuba
Municipalities of Cuba

References

External links

Playa Mayabeque on fallingrain.com
San Cristobal de La Habana at south

Populated places in Mayabeque Province